is a  (fictional prose narrative) containing elements of Japanese folklore. Written by an unknown author in the late 9th or early 10th century during the Heian period, it is considered the oldest surviving work in the  form.

The story details the life of Kaguya-hime, a princess from the Moon who is discovered as a baby inside the stalk of a glowing bamboo plant. After she grows, her beauty attracts five suitors seeking her hand in marriage, whom she turns away by challenging them each with an impossible task; she later attracts the affection of the Emperor of Japan. At the tale's end, Kaguya-hime reveals her celestial origins and returns to the Moon.

Background
The Tale of the Bamboo Cutter is considered the oldest surviving , though its exact date of composition is unknown. A mention of smoke rising from Mount Fuji in The Tale of the Bamboo Cutter suggests that the volcano was still active at the time of its composition; the  indicates that the mountain had stopped emitting smoke by 905. Other evidence suggests the tale was written between 871 and 881.

The author of The Tale of the Bamboo Cutter is also unknown, and scholars have variously attributed the work to Minamoto no Shitagō (911–983), to the Abbot Henjō, to a member of the Inbe clan, to a member of a political faction opposed to Emperor Tenmu, and to the  poet Ki no Haseo (842–912).

Some modern commentators regard The Tale of the Bamboo Cutter as proto-science fiction, although few mainstream scholars would endorse this interpretation. The concept of travel between the moon and the earth might superficially resemble science fiction, but it held no such associations in the belief systems of the Heian period. For the original audience of The Tale of the Bamboo Cutter, the moon that Kaguya-hime ascended to was a mythical topos, much like Hо̄rai or the undersea Dragon Palace. The motif of flight to the moon was closely tied to the Daoist cult of immortality, which enjoyed considerable popularity among the early Heian nobility; indeed, Daoist legends shaped "the earliest stratum of immortality legends in Japan," which in turn "formed the germ of" The Tale of the Bamboo Cutter.

Narrative

One day in the bamboo forest, an old bamboo cutter called  comes across a mysterious, shining stalk of bamboo. Upon cutting it open, he is surprised to find an infant the size of his thumb inside. The old man and his wife, having no children of their own, decide to raise the infant as their own daughter, and name her . From that moment on, every time the man cuts a stalk of bamboo, he finds a small nugget of gold inside. The family soon grows rich, and within just three months, Kaguya-hime grows from an infant into a woman of ordinary size and extraordinary beauty. At first, the old man tries to keep news of Kaguya-hime away from outsiders, but as word of her beauty spreads, she attracts many suitors who seek her hand in marriage.

They eventually persuade the old man to have Kaguya-hime choose from among them. Uninterested, Kaguya-hime devises five impossible tasks, agreeing to marry the noble who can bring her the item specified for him: the stone begging bowl of the Buddha, a jeweled branch from the mythical island of Hōrai, a robe of Chinese fire-rat skins, a colored jewel from a dragon's neck, and a cowry shell born from a swallow.

Realizing the impossibility of his task, the first noble presents a fake stone bowl made from a blackened pot, but is exposed when Kaguya-hime notices that the bowl does not glow with holy light. The second noble presents a branch created  by the country's finest jewelers, but is revealed  when a messenger of the craftsmen arrives at Kaguya-hime's house to collect payment. The third noble is deceived by a merchant from China, who sells him a robe that burns when it is tested with fire. The fourth noble sets out to find a dragon at sea, but abandons his plans after encountering a storm. The fifth noble falls from a great height while reaching into a swallow's nest.

After this, the Emperor of Japan comes to visit Kaguya-hime and, after falling in love, asks her hand in marriage. Although he is not subjected to an impossible trial, Kaguya-hime rejects his request for marriage as well, telling him that she is not from his country and therefore cannot go to the palace with him. She remains in contact with the Emperor, but continues to rebuff his proposals. Three years pass as they continue to communicate by letter.

That summer, whenever Kaguya-hime views the full moon, her eyes fill with tears. Though her adoptive parents grow very worried and question her, she refuses to tell them what is wrong. Her behaviour becomes increasingly erratic until she reveals that she is not of the Earth and that she must return to her people on the moon. It is said that she was sent to the Earth, where she would inevitably form material attachment, as a punishment for some crime without further description. The gold was a stipend from the people of the moon, sent to pay for Kaguya-hime's upkeep.

As the day of her return approaches, the Emperor sends his guards to protect her from the Moon's people, but when an embassy of heavenly beings descends upon the bamboo cutter's house, the guards are blinded by a strange light. Kaguya-hime announces that, though she loves her many friends on Earth, she must return with the beings to her true home on the Moon. She writes sad notes of apology to her parents and to the Emperor, then gives her parents her own robe as a memento. She then takes a little of the elixir of immortality, attaches it to her letter to the Emperor, and gives it to the guard officer. As she hands it to him, a feather robe is placed on her shoulders, and all of her sadness and compassion for the people of the Earth are apparently forgotten.

The old couple become very sad and are soon put to bed sick. The officer returns to the Emperor with the items Kaguya-hime gave him as her last mortal act, and reports what happened. The Emperor reads her letter and is overcome with sadness, and asks his servants, "Which mountain is the closest place to Heaven?"; in response, one suggests the Great Mountain of Suruga Province. The Emperor then orders his men to take the letter to the summit of the mountain and burn it, in the hope that his message would reach the distant princess. They are also ordered to burn the elixir of immortality, as the Emperor does not wish to live for eternity without being able to see her.

It is said that the smoke from the burning still rises to this day. (In the past, Mount Fuji was a much more active volcano and therefore produced more smoke.)

Literary connections

Elements of the tale were drawn from earlier stories. The protagonist Taketori no Okina appears in the earlier poetry collection  (poem #3791). In it, he meets a group of women and recites a poem to them. This indicates that there previously existed an image or tale revolving around a bamboo cutter and celestial or mystical women.

A similar retelling of the tale appears in the 12th century  (volume 31, chapter 33), although the relationship between these texts is debated.

In the early 1970s, Japanese literary researchers became aware that , one of the tales in the book, had certain similarities with The Tale of the Bamboo Cutter.

Initially, many researchers believed  to be related to Tale of Bamboo Cutter, although some were skeptical. In the 1980s, studies showed that the relationship between these stories was not as simple as initially thought. Okutsu provides an extensive review of the research, and notes that the book  was intended to be for children, and as such, the editor took some liberties in adapting the tales. No other compilation of Tibetan tales contains the story. A Tibetan-born person wrote that he did not know the story. A researcher went to Sichuan and found that, apart from those who had already read , local researchers in Chengdu did not know the story. Several Tibetan sources in Ngawa Tibetan and Qiang Autonomous Prefecture did not know the story either. The philological consensus is that the author of the 1957 book purposefully copied The Tale of the Bamboo Cutter.

Chang'e
The Chinese legend of Chang'e can be traced to the second century BCE. According to the main telling of the legend, a  named Chang'e came to Earth, thereby losing her immortality. To get it back, she stole the elixir of immortality from the Queen Mother of the West, then fled to the moon.

Legacy
The Tale of the Bamboo Cutter is a popular folk tale in Japan. It has been adapted, updated and reworked into numerous modern media, especially Japanese pop culture media such as manga and anime.

Modern adaptations
Generally faithful adaptations of the original story include the following:

 Princess Kaguya  1935 live-action Japanese film directed by Yoshitsugu Tanaka, with cinematography by Eiji Tsuburaya.
Princess from the Moon  1987 live-action Japanese film directed by Kon Ichikawa, and starring Toshiro Mifune and Yasuko Sawaguchi.
 The Tale of the Princess Kaguya  2013 anime film, directed by Isao Takahata and produced by Studio Ghibli.

Modern updates and reworkings of the original story are found in numerous other works:

 Queen Millennia (The New Tale of the Bamboo Cutter)  1980 Japanese  manga, light novel and anime franchise created by Leiji Matsumoto.
 Please Save My Earth  1986  manga and 1993 anime series.
 Big Bird in Japan  1989 American Sesame Street television special.
 Sailor Moon  1991 Japanese  manga and anime franchise.
 Sailor Moon S  1994 anime television series.
 Sailor Moon S: The Movie  1994 anime film.
 Soul Eater  2003  manga.
 From the Towers of the Moon  1992 American theatrical opera, inspired by the film Princess from the Moon.
 Turn A Gundam  1999 Gundam anime series and film.
 Naruto  1999 Japanese  manga and anime franchise.
 Mushishi  1999 manga and 2006 anime.
 Oh! Edo Rocket  2001 Japanese play and novel and 2007 manga and anime series.
 Inuyasha the Movie: The Castle Beyond the Looking Glass  2002 Inuyasha anime film.
 In the 2003 book  Princess Kaguya portrays the Narcissus conflict, a contradictory desire to coincide perfectly with the beloved and at the same time to be a unique and free individual.
 Imperishable Night  2004 Touhou Project video game 
 Ōkami  2006 Capcom video game.
 Shiren the Wanderer  2008 video game.
 Persona 4 Golden  Persona Kaguya Hime in this 2012 enhanced port of Persona 4 video game is based on the tale.
 Kaguya-sama: Love Is War  2015  manga and 2019 anime series.
 Prince Kaguya  2015 musical.
 Pokémon Sun and Moon  Ultra Beast Celesteela from this 2016 video game is based on the tale.
 Fly Me to the Moon  2018  manga and 2020 anime series.
 Star Twinkle Precure  Kaguya Madoka in this 2019 anime, who transforms into Cure Selene, is based on Princess Kaguya
 Ninja Box  The kunoichi Takewaka-chan and her evolution from this 2019 Nintendo Switch game were based on Princess Kaguya.

Notes

References

Bibliography
 Edward Drott. "'To Tread on High Clouds': Dreams of Eternal Youth in Early Japan." Japanese Journal of Religious Studies vol. 42, no. 2 (2015), 275-317.
 Katagiri Yōichi, Fukui Teisuke, Takahashi Seiji and Shimizu Yoshiko. 1994.  in  series. Tokyo: Shogakukan.
 Donald Keene (translator), The Tale of the Bamboo Cutter, 
 Japan at a Glance Updated, pages 164—165 (brief abstract)
 Fumiko Enchi, "Kaguya-hime",  (in Japanese hiragana)
 
 
, Japanese Text Initiative, Electronic Text Center, University of Virginia Library

 
 Eugene Y. Wang. "Mirror, Moon and Memory in Eighth-Century China: From Dragon Pond to Lunar Palace." Cleveland Studies in the History of Art vol. 9 (2005), 42-67.

Further reading

External links

 
 Ryukoku University exhibition
 Tetsuo Kawamoto: The Moon Princess (translated by Clarence Calkins)

9th-century books
Buddhist folklore
Extraterrestrial life in popular culture
Japanese fairy tales
Japanese folklore
Japanese science fiction
Late Old Japanese texts
Heian period in literature
Monogatari
Fiction set on the Moon
Fiction about alchemy
Works of unknown authorship
Japanese bildungsromans
Kaguya-hime